Les Thompson (30 April 1928 – 25 July 2018) was an Australian rules footballer who played with Collingwood in the Victorian Football League (VFL).

Notes

External links 

1928 births
Australian rules footballers from Victoria (Australia)
Collingwood Football Club players
2018 deaths